The Tomb of Anarkali is an octagonal 16th century Mughal monument in Lahore, capital of the Pakistani province of Punjab.

Location
The tomb of Anarkali is located on the grounds of Lahore's Punjab Civil Secretariat complex near the British-era Mall, southwest of the Walled City of Lahore. It is considered to be one of the earliest Mughal tombs still in existence, and is considered to be one of the most significant buildings of the early Mughal period. The building is currently used as the Punjab Archives, and public access is limited.

History

Construction of the tomb dates to either 1599, or 1615.

The tomb was said to be built by the Mughal Emperor Jehangir for his love, named in contemporary travel accounts as Anarkali, as per legend, was suspected by Emperor Akbar for relations with Jehangir, at the time known as Prince Saleem.  There is no other historic proof of Anarakali's existence than that of Jahangir's contemporary western traveler's accounts which could not be independently confirmed; the rest is some scholarly speculated hypothesis  and/ or subsequent literary fictionalization of  her character which often appears in movies, books and fictionalized versions of history.

During the time of the Sikh Empire, the tomb was occupied by Kharak Singh, and later was further desecrated by its conversion into the residence for the wife of General Jean-Baptiste Ventura, who was employed in the army of Ranjit Singh. The tomb was then converted during the British Raj into clerical offices in 1847 before repurposing the tomb into the Anglican St. James Church in 1851, and later regarded as Lahore's "Protestant Cathedral." In 1891, the church congregation was relocated, and the tomb was repurposed as the Punjab Record Office.

The occupant's cenotaph was removed when the tomb was repurposed into a church. When the building no longer served as a church, the cenotaph was placed at the site of the former altar, and not at the original site of the cenotaph.

Architecture

The structure's foundation are in the basic shape of an octagon, with alternating measurements of 44 feet and 30 feet for each side with semi-octagonal towers at each corner. The structure is also topped by a double-dome, and is one of the earlier examples of such a dome from the Mughal era. The dome rests upon 8 arches, each measuring 12 feet 3 inches.

The large arches in the sides of the building were once open in typical Mughal fashion, but were blocked off by the British.

The building is today covered in whitewashing. It was reportedly once surrounded by a garden. The building is currently used as the Punjab Archives, so access to the public is limited.

Cenotaph

The white marble cenotaph features carvings with the 99 names of Allah, and was described by 19th-century historians as "one of the finest pieces of carving in the world."

Inscription

In addition to the 99 names of Allah, the cenotaph is inscribed with a Persian couplet taken from the Persian poet Saadi which reads: 

"Ah! could I behold the face of my beloved once more,
I would give thanks unto my Creator until the day of resurrection"

Conservation
The tomb is listed on the Protected Heritage Monuments of the Archaeology Department of Punjab.

Notes

References

1615 establishments in India
Mughal tombs
Mausoleums in Punjab, Pakistan
Architecture of Lahore
Tombs in Lahore
Mughal gardens in Pakistan
Persian gardens in Pakistan